Carpocorini is a tribe of stink bugs in the family Pentatomidae. There are about 15 genera and at least 50 described species in Carpocorini.

Genera
These 15 genera belong to the tribe Carpocorini:

 Antheminia Mulsant & Rey, 1866 g b
 Coenus Dallas, 1851 i c g b
 Cosmopepla Stål, 1867 i c g b
 Euschistus Dallas, 1851 i c g b
 Holcostethus Fieber, 1860 i c g b
 Hymenarcys Amyot & Serville, 1843 i c g b
 Kermana Rolston & McDonald, 1981 i c g b
 Mcphersonarcys b
 Menecles Stål, 1867 i c g b
 Mormidea Amyot & Serville, 1843 i c g b
 Moromorpha Rolston, 1978 i c g b
 Oebalus Stål, 1862 i c g b
 Prionosoma Uhler, 1863 g b
 Proxys Spinola, 1840 i c g b
 Trichopepla Stål, 1867 i c g b

Data sources: i = ITIS, c = Catalogue of Life, g = GBIF, b = Bugguide.net

References

Further reading

External links

 

 
Pentatominae
Hemiptera tribes